Covington is a city in central Tipton County, Tennessee, United States. Covington is the second largest city and county seat of Tipton County. The city's population was 9,038 at the time of the 2010 U.S. Census.

History
The Covington area was originally inhabited by Native Americans of various tribes. They used the nearby Mississippi River as a trading route among numerous American Indian nations, who for more than 1,000 years conducted continent-deep trading between the upper river and the Southeast. Evidence of such trading has been found in materials and items excavated from numerous archeological sites.

Tipton County is one of five present-day counties of the State of Tennessee that border the Mississippi River. The first Europeans to explore this area were attached to the noted expedition of the French Canadians Jacques Marquette and Louis Joliet in 1673. This expedition went down the Mississippi from present-day Wisconsin to the mouth of the Arkansas River, and then back upriver to Lake Michigan. The Arkansas River represents part of the border between present-day Arkansas and Mississippi. It is likely that de Soto and his men passed near here circa 1541.

During the 19th century, because this entire area consists of fertile floodplains and a climate of long, hot summers, and adequate rainfall, the Covington area and the rest of West Tennessee were developed for cotton plantations. This became the primary commodity crop across the South in the 19th century, generating great wealth for many large planters. African-American slaves were brought to Western Tennessee by planters relocating here, or forced here by sale in the domestic slave trade. West Tennessee was the center of large-scale slavery in Tennessee, and Memphis had a major slave market.  Planters and farmers in Middle Tennessee also held slaves, although in fewer number. Farmers in the eastern part of the state mostly developed small subsistence farms and held few slaves.

During the Civil War, Union Army and Union Navy fought to gain control of strategic areas along the Mississippi River in order to control its traffic and split the Confederate States in two. The Confederate Army resisted, but the Union Army defeated and occupied forces in Tipton and other counties of Tennessee and northeastern Arkansas. The war ended early in the Covington area, and Tennessee was occupied by Union forces from 1862.

Starting in the 1870s during the Reconstruction era, the state legislature supported railroad construction in the region, to improve transporting crops to market. The Memphis and Paducah Railroad completed its tracks to Covington in July 1873. The first telegraph line between Memphis and Covington was completed in 1882. In 1894, electric power was installed in Covington. The city established a municipal water system in 1898 to provide residents with pure drinking water.

Twentieth-century improvements included street paving in 1922. Since 1929, a natural gas company has operated to provide cooking gas and wintertime heating to homes and business in Covington. The time that telephone service was installed in Covington is not known.

Following the invention of the automobile, during the 1910s and 1920s the United States began to construct more intercity paved highways in various regions of the county. These developed into the U.S. Numbered Highway System, and U.S. Route 51 was established. This highway connects Memphis and points south with Chicago, via Covington and Cairo, Illinois. Covington is a small town with access to a major north–south highway of commerce and travel.

Both black and white tenant farmers and sharecroppers in West Tennessee struggled with poverty as a result of lower cotton prices during the Great Depression, which added to social tensions between ethnic groups. Whites maintained their political supremacy, having disenfranchised most blacks at the turn of the 20th century. After an armed altercation during a July 1937 police raid on an illegal gambling site, Albert Gooden was arrested as a suspect in the death of a sheriff's deputy. Because of lynching threats, the sheriff took the African-American man to be held in custody in Memphis. A month later, when the sheriff was secretly transporting Gooden back to Covington to stand trial, his car was stopped on an isolated road. Masked men took Gooden away. His body was found the next day, half in the river and shot more than 30 times. The governor offered a $5000 reward, but no one was prosecuted for the lynching. Gooden was the first man to be lynched in Tipton County since the late 19th century; his was one of several lynchings in the nation that year. It was covered by The New York Times and other major newspapers.

The South Main Street Historic District in Covington includes about 50 houses from the late 19th and the early 20th centuries, along with commercial structures of historic interest.

Geography
U.S. Route 51, a major north–south highway running between Mississippi and Illinois, passes through the city.

Covington is situated on the southeastern edge of the New Madrid Seismic Zone, an area judged by geologists to have a high risk of earthquakes in the future.

Climate
The climate in this area is characterized by hot, humid summers and generally mild to cool winters.  According to the Köppen Climate Classification system, Covington has a humid subtropical climate, abbreviated "Cfa" on climate maps.

Demographics

2020 census

As of the 2020 United States census, there were 8,663 people, 3,456 households, and 2,179 families residing in the city.

2000 census
As of the census of 2000, there were 8,463 people, 3,199 households, and 2,136 families residing in the city. The racial makeup of the city was 51.59% White, 46.54% African American, 0.48% Native American, 0.44% Asian, 0.05% Pacific Islander, 0.25% from other races, and 0.65% from two or more races. Hispanic or Latino of any race were 0.79% of the population.

There were 3,199 households, out of which 34.1% had children under the age of 18 living with them, 37.9% were married couples living together, 25.4% had a female householder with no husband present, and 33.2% were non-families. 29.9% of all households were made up of individuals, and 13.4% had someone living alone who was 65 years of age or older. The average household size was 2.54 and the average family size was 3.17.

In the city, the population was spread out, with 29.7% under the age of 18, 10.3% from 18 to 24, 25.3% from 25 to 44, 19.3% from 45 to 64, and 15.5% who were 65 years of age or older. The median age was 33 years. For every 100 females, there were 79.0 males. For every 100 females age 18 and over, there were 70.8 males.

The median income for a household in the city was $24,684, and the median income for a family was $32,213. Males had a median income of $28,964 versus $20,938 for females. The per capita income for the city was $14,293. About 25.2% of families and 27.9% of the population were below the poverty line, including 37.9% of those under age 18 and 34.1% of those age 65 or over.

Arts and culture

Tipton County Museum
The Tipton County Museum is located in Covington.  This museum displays and interprets artifacts from Tipton County's rich heritage. It also has a nature center depicting the unique ecosystem of West Tennessee.  Mountings of local animal species are kept there, and fragments of mastodon bone represent species alive during its ancient natural history. Adjacent to the museum, there is a 20-acre park, with a  walking trail. Natural woodland and a man-made wetland provide habitat to some of the smaller local species such as turtles and birds.

The Veterans Memorial in front of the museum commemorates the soldiers from the county who lost their lives in wars. This museum is closed on Sundays and Mondays, and admission to the museum and to the park is free.

Education
Covington Public Schools are part of Tipton County Schools. The Tipton County School District has six elementary schools, one K-8 magnet school, three middle schools and three high schools.

Schools located in Covington include:
Austin Peay Elementary School
Crestview Elementary School
Covington Integrated Arts Academy
Crestview Middle School
Covington High School
Tipton County Alternative Learning Center

Dr. John Combs is the Director of Schools.

Notable people
 William F. Bringle, US navy Admiral 
 Tony Delk, pro basketball player 
 Augustus Hill Garland, 11th Governor of Arkansas and Attorney General of the United States
 Isaac Hayes was born here; the composer and musician has been inducted in the Hall-of-Fame
 Harvey Hendrick, former Baseball player and member of the New York Yankees first World Series championship team 1923
 Leigh Snowden, actress, is from Covington; her granddaughter was named Covington after her home town.

References

External links

Official website

Cities in Tipton County, Tennessee
County seats in Tennessee
Memphis metropolitan area